Blommer Chocolate Company is an integrated chocolate manufacturer based in Chicago, Illinois, and it is considered to be the largest chocolate-ingredient supplier in North America. Prior to its acquisition by Fuji Oil Holdings, Inc. in 2018, the company was the largest and oldest independent cocoa bean processor in North America.

History 
Blommer Chocolate was founded in 1939 by the brothers, Henry, Al, and Bernard in Chicago. The family (pronounced "Blummer") has roots  in the confectionary, farming and ice cream business. 

In 1948, the company acquired Bishop chocolate in Los Angeles and Boldeman Chocolate in San Francisco in 1951. In 1970, Blommer opened their second production plant in Union City, California, followed by a plant in East Greenville, Pennsylvania in 1980. In 2001 the company broke ground for a new warehouse in Pennsylvania. 

In 2003, Blommer employed around 450 people and crossed $500 million in revenue. In 2006, the company acquired a production plant from World's Finest Chocolate in Ontario, Canada.

In 2018, the company was sold to Fuji Oil Holdings Inc. for $750 million. After the transaction, the Blommer family and senior management continued to lead the company. 

In 2022, the company announced that Peter Blommer, the grandson of Henry Blommer who had started working with Blommer Chocolate aged 17 in 1991, will step down as CEO of the company. He will continue to serve in the role of Vice Chairman, while Nao Rokukawa, current Chairman of Blommer, will take over as interim CEO until the position will be filled again later this year.

Corporate affairs

Factories and store 
The company operates four plants in North America:
 Campbellford, Ontario
 Chicago, Illinois
 East Greenville, Pennsylvania
 Union City, California
The company also operates an external R&D facility in Chicago and another production plant in China.

Aroma 
The factory in the West Loop area of Chicago is known for sending a chocolate aroma into the air. Though the smell is popular among many Chicagoans, in 2006, a nearby condo owner complained to the EPA about the smell, complaining that it violated the Clean Air Act. Blommer was not fined, having explained that it was upgrading its filtration system. The chocolate smell remains.

Products 
More than 45% of cocoa beans processed in the United States are processed (into cocoa butter, cocoa solids and chocolate liquor) by Blommer; about 70% of their business is supplying chocolate to various branded companies for use in those companies' own products.

Blommer's Chocolates Company does not sell directly through retail. Another branch of the family owned and operated a retail store located in the front corner of the Chicago manufacturing site until February, 2020, which sold various chocolates and chocolate baking supplies purchased from Blommer and other vendors.

Literature 

 Blommer: An American Chocolate Legacy by Beth Kimmerle, 2010

References

American chocolate companies
Manufacturing companies based in Chicago
Food and drink companies established in 1939
1939 establishments in Illinois